is a passenger railway station located in  Minami-ku, Yokohama, Kanagawa Prefecture, Japan, operated by the private railway company Keikyū.

Lines
Minamiōta Station is served by the Keikyū Main Line and is located 26.5 kilometers from the terminus of the line at Shinagawa  Station in Tokyo.

Station layout
The station consists of two elevated opposed side platforms serving two tracks on passing loops to permit the through passage of express trains. The station buildings built underneath

Platforms

History
Minamiōta Station was opened on 1 April 1930.

Keikyū introduced station numbering to its stations on 21 October 2010; Minamiōta Station was assigned station number KK41.

Passenger statistics
In fiscal 2019, the station was used by an average of 17,523 passengers daily. 

The passenger figures for previous years are as shown below.

Surrounding area
 Yokohama City Minamiota Elementary School
Yokohama Commercial High School
Kanagawa Prefectural Yokohama Seiryo General High School
Yokohama Minamiota Post Office

See also
 List of railway stations in Japan

References

External links

 

Railway stations in Kanagawa Prefecture
Railway stations in Japan opened in 1930
Keikyū Main Line
Railway stations in Yokohama